John Mills Goodloe (August 5, 1858 – August 17, 1942) was an American Republican politician who served as a member of the Virginia Senate, representing the state's 2nd district.

Political career
Goodloe defeated incumbent John H. Catron, who ran as a Progressive, and Independent T. B. Ely to win election to the Virginia Senate in 1915.

Electoral history

References

External links
 

1858 births
1942 deaths
Republican Party Virginia state senators
Politicians from Baltimore
20th-century American politicians